In information theory, the limiting density of discrete points is an adjustment to the formula of Claude Shannon for differential entropy.

It was formulated by Edwin Thompson Jaynes to address defects in the initial definition of differential entropy.

Definition 
Shannon originally wrote down the following formula for the entropy of a continuous distribution, known as differential entropy:
 
Unlike Shannon's formula for the discrete entropy, however, this is not the result of any derivation (Shannon simply replaced the summation symbol in the discrete version with an integral), and it lacks many of the properties that make the discrete entropy a useful measure of uncertainty. In particular, it is not invariant under a change of variables and can become negative. In addition, it is not even dimensionally correct.

Jaynes argued that the formula for the continuous entropy should be derived by taking the limit of increasingly dense discrete distributions.  Suppose that we have a set of  discrete points , such that in the limit  their density approaches a function  called the "invariant measure".  

Jaynes derived from this the following formula for the continuous entropy, which he argued should be taken as the correct formula:
 

Typically, when this is written, the term  is omitted, as that would typically not be finite. So the actual common definition is

 

Where it is unclear whether or not the  term should be omitted, one could write

 

Notice that in Jaynes' formula,  is a probability density. For any finite  that  is a uniform density over the quantization of the continuous space that is used in the Riemann sum. In the limit,  is the continuous limiting density of points in the quantization used to represent the continuous variable .

Suppose one had a number format that took on  possible values, distributed as per . Then  (if  is large enough that the continuous approximation is valid) is the discrete entropy of the variable  in this encoding.

(This motivates the name "invariant measure" for m.) This solves many of the difficulties that come from applying Shannon's continuous entropy formula. Jaynes himself dropped the  term as it was not relevant to his work (maximum entropy distributions), and it is somewhat awkward to have an infinite term in the calculation. Unfortunately, this cannot be helped if the quantization is made arbitrarily fine, as would be the case in the continuous limit. Note that  as defined here (without the  term) would always be non-positive, because a KL divergence would always be non-negative.

References

Further reading 
 

Theory of probability distributions
Information theory